The Hunters Oak Golf Classic was a golf tournament for professional women golfers on the Futures Tour, the LPGA Tour's developmental tour. The event was part of the Futures Tour's schedule from 2003 to 2007 and was held at Hunters Oak Golf Club in Queenstown, Maryland.

The tournament was a 54-hole event, as are most Futures Tour tournaments, and included pre-tournament pro-am opportunities, in which local communities members could play with the professional golfers from the Tour.  Benefiting charities from the Hunters Oak Golf Classic included the Chesapeake Bay Environmental Center.

Winners

External links
FuturesTour official website

Former Symetra Tour events
Golf in Maryland